Brachypalpus is a genus of hoverflies, from the family Syrphidae, in the order Diptera.
The head is triangular and produced well forwards and somewhat downwards. The thorax and abdomen with pile often rather long. The hind femur is swollen and with an obtuse spur apically and ventrally. The hind trochanters of male is spurred. 
The larvae are of the rat-tailed type feeding on decaying sap under tree bark. Larvae live in decaying trees and logs. Larva and pupa have been described by Malloch.

Species
Brachypalpus alopex (Osten Sacken, 1877)
Brachypalpus amithaon Walker, 1849
Brachypalpus chrysites Egger, 1859
Brachypalpus cyanella Osten Sacken, 1877
Brachypalpus cyanogaster Loew, 1872
Brachypalpus dives (Brunetti, 1908)
Brachypalpus femoratus (Williston, 1882)
Brachypalpus longifacies Mutin & Ichige, 2019
Brachypalpus nigrifacies Stackelberg, 1965
Brachypalpus nipponicus Shiraki, 1952
Brachypalpus oarus (Walker, 1849)
Brachypalpus olivaceus Meigen, 1822
Brachypalpus valgus (Panzer, 1798)
Brachypalpus zugmayeriae Mik, 1887

References

Hoverfly genera
Taxa named by Pierre-Justin-Marie Macquart
Diptera of Europe
Diptera of Asia
Diptera of North America
Eristalinae